Dame Dobson is a 1683 comedy play by the English writer Edward Ravenscroft.

First staged by the United Company at the Dorset Garden Theatre, the original cast included Katherine Corey as Dame Dobson, Edward Kynaston as Collonel, Thomas Jevon as Gillet, John Wiltshire as Gerrard, William Mountfort as Hartwell, George Bright as Farmer, John Richards as Goslin, Anthony Leigh as Jenkin, Mary Lee as Lady Noble, Elizabeth Currer as Mrs Featly, Elinor Leigh as Mrs Prudence, Charlotte Butler as  Mrs Cleremont and Margaret Osborne as Mrs Hellen.

In 1726 Charles Johnson wrote a reworking of the plot as The Female Fortune Teller.

References

Bibliography
 Canfield, J. Douglas. Tricksters and Estates: On the Ideology of Restoration Comedy. University Press of Kentucky, 2014.
 Van Lennep, W. The London Stage, 1660-1800: Volume One, 1660-1700. Southern Illinois University Press, 1960.

1683 plays
West End plays
Restoration comedy
Plays by Edward Ravenscroft